In Greek mythology, Eteoclymene (Ancient Greek: Ετεοκλυμένη) was a Minyan princess as the daughter of King Minyas of Orchomenus probably either by Euryale, Clytodora, or Phanosyra, daughter of Paeon. Her possible siblings were Clymene, Periclymene, Orchomenus, Presbon, Athamas, Diochthondas, Elara, Persephone and the Minyades. In some accounts, Eteoclymene, Periclymene and Clymene are the same person.

Notes

References 

 Gaius Julius Hyginus, Fabulae from The Myths of Hyginus translated and edited by Mary Grant. University of Kansas Publications in Humanistic Studies. Online version at the Topos Text Project.
 Lucius Mestrius Plutarchus, Moralia with an English Translation by Frank Cole Babbitt. Cambridge, MA. Harvard University Press. London. William Heinemann Ltd. 1936. Online version at the Perseus Digital Library. Greek text available from the same website.
 Publius Ovidius Naso, Metamorphoses translated by Brookes More (1859-1942). Boston, Cornhill Publishing Co. 1922. Online version at the Perseus Digital Library.
 Publius Ovidius Naso, Metamorphoses. Hugo Magnus. Gotha (Germany). Friedr. Andr. Perthes. 1892. Latin text available at the Perseus Digital Library.

Princesses in Greek mythology
Minyan characters in Greek mythology